The Cardwell Hills are a mountain range in Benton County, Oregon.

References 

Mountain ranges of Oregon
Landforms of Benton County, Oregon